Kabaka Puttur is a major railway station on Mangalore–Hassan–Mysore line. It is located in Padil,Puttur, Dakshina Kannada district, Karnataka state, India. It consists of two platforms. It is named after two places: Kabaka which is 5 km away from railway station location and Puttur where railway station lies. The railway station lies 1.2 km away from Puttur KSRTC bus stand and 1.1 km away from Puttur–Uppinangadi Main Road

Location 
Kabaka Puttur Railway Station serves Puttur city of Dakshina Kannada district. It belongs to Mysuru railway division part of South Western Railway zone of Indian Railways.

Services 
There are several trains to Mangaluru, Karwar, Vijayapura, Yesvantpur, Bengaluru, Mysuru, Hubballi which stops at Kabaka Puttur railway station. Train number 16523/16524, 16513/16514 has been stopped for easy running of 16595/16596. Demands has been made for restarting train number 16513/16514, 16523/16524 with the reason that this will not loose the demand.

References

Transport in Dakshina Kannada district
Railway stations in Dakshina Kannada district

Railway stations in Karnataka